The Ecclesiastical Licences Act 1536 (28 Hen 8 c 16) was an Act of the Parliament of England.

The whole Act, so far as unrepealed, was repealed by section 1 of, and Part II of the Schedule to, the Statute Law (Repeals) Act 1969.

Preamble
The preamble was repealed by section 1 of, and Schedule 1 to, the Statute Law Revision Act 1948.

Section 1
This section, from "and shall never" onwards was repealed by section 13(2) of, and Part I of Schedule 4 to, the Criminal Law Act 1967.

Section 2
This section was repealed by section 1 of, and Schedule 1 to, the Statute Law Revision Act 1948.

Section 3
In this section, the words "And that all ecclesiasticall" to "their obedience and" were repealed by section 1 of, and Schedule 1 to, the Statute Law Revision Act 1948.

Section 4
This section was repealed by section 1 of, and Schedule 1 to, the Statute Law Revision Act 1948.

See also
Halsbury's Statutes
Marriage Act 1955, a New Zealand Act of Parliament which replaced provisions of the Ecclesiastical Licences Act 1536

References

Acts of the Parliament of England (1485–1603)
1536 in law
1536 in England